The frequent flyer program is a controversial technique used by the U.S. in the Guantanamo Bay detainment camps, in Cuba.  
Guards deprived detainees of sleep by moving them from one cell to another, multiple times a day, for days or weeks on end.

The technique was used to "soften up" detainees prior to interrogation. Guantanamo guards were ordered to discontinue the use of the technique in March 2004, although the practice persisted until at least later that year.

Major David Frakt, USAF, defense counsel to a recipient of the program, Mohamed Jawad, said:

In August 2008, in testimony at Jawad's Guantanamo military commission trial, Army officers confirmed the existence of the frequent flyer program.
At least 17 detainees were subjected to the program.

In May 2012 Ramzi Kassem, a lawyer for detainee Shaker Aamer, said his client alleges the frequent flyer program was still being used as a punishment technique in the isolation block known as Camp Five Echo.

See also 
 Mohamed Jawad
 Ghassan al-Shirbi
 Torture

References

Guantanamo Bay detention camp
Interrogation techniques
Sleeplessness and sleep deprivation